The list of ship commissionings in 1958 includes a chronological list of all ships commissioned in 1958.

See also 

1958